Cottoclinus canops is a species of labrisomid blenny endemic to the Galápagos Islands. It is the only known member of its genus.

References

Labrisomidae
Endemic fauna of the Galápagos Islands
Galápagos Islands coastal fauna
Fish described in 2003